During the 2012 presidential primaries, 51 individuals sought the nomination of the Democratic Party. Incumbent President Barack Obama won the nomination unanimously at the 2012 Democratic National Convention and was re-elected as president in the general election by defeating Republican nominee Mitt Romney.
As expected for the incumbent president, Obama won every primary election, but faced more difficulty than projected. Fifteen additional candidates appeared on primary ballots, and of these, four appeared on more than one ballot. Four qualified for convention delegates including: attorney John Wolfe, Jr., prison inmate Keith Russell Judd, perennial candidate Jim Rogers, and anti-abortion activist Randall Terry. Each of these had their delegates stripped prior to the convention due to technicalities.

Thirty-four additional candidates filed with the Federal Election Commission (FEC) to run for president, but either withdrew from the race before the primaries or did not appear on any primary ballots.

Candidates
The following individuals formally announced their campaigns for the Democratic Party presidential nomination in 2012 and/or filed as a candidate for such with the Federal Election Commission (FEC).

Incumbent

Challengers

On multiple primary ballots
The following candidates appeared on more than one primary ballot.

On one primary ballot
The following candidates appeared on only one primary ballot.

FEC-filed candidates
The following presidential candidates filed with the FEC, but either did not appear on any primary ballots or withdrew before the primary elections.

 Warren Roderick Ashe (FEC Filing)
 George Ballard (FEC Filing)
 Will Blakley (FEC Filing)
 James Carroll (FEC Filing)
 Willie Carter (FEC Filing), (Website)
 Perry Duwhile Coleman (FEC Filing)
 Anthony Joseph Cronin Jr. (FEC filing)
 Darren Dunsmoor (FEC filing)
 Mills Wrenal Godwin (FEC filing)
 Patrice Eloise Hardcastle (FEC filing)

 Raphael Herman (FEC filing)
 Princess Khadajah M. Jacob-Fambro (FEC filing)
 Cody Judy (FEC filing), (Website)
 Dennis Knill (FEC filing), (Website)
 Leah Lax (FEC filing), (Website)
 Kip Lee (FEC filing)
 Mark Levetin (FEC filing)
 James A. Miller (FEC filing)
 Mike Moloney (FEC filing)
 Dave Montgomery (FEC filing)

 Deonia Neveu (FEC filing), (Website)
 Jennifer Ney (FEC filing)
 Dean A. Phillips (FEC filing)
 Jeff Proud (FEC filing), (Website)
 Sarah Rockefeller (FEC filing)
 Philip Rogone (FEC filing)
 Wil Stand (FEC filing)
 Gary Stephens (FEC filing)
 Dr. Damian Stone (FEC filing)
 George Washington Williams (FEC filing)
 Michael Yost (FEC filing)

Speculated
The following individuals were the object of presidential speculation in past media reports, but did not signal an interest in running.

Declined to run
The following individuals speculated to run for the Democratic Party's 2012 presidential nomination, announced they would not run.

See also
 Republican Party presidential candidates, 2012
 United States third party and independent presidential candidates, 2012
 2012 United States presidential election timeline

References

External links
 2012 Presidential Form 2 Filers at the Federal Election Commission (FEC)

 
Democratic Party (United States) politicians
2012 United States Democratic presidential primaries